King Edward VII may refer to the following schools:

England
 King Edward VII School (King's Lynn), King's Lynn, Norfolk
 King Edward VII and Queen Mary School, Lytham St Anne's, Lancashire
 King Edward VII School, Sheffield, Sheffield, South Yorkshire
 King Edward VII School, Melton Mowbray, Melton Mowbray, Leicestershire

Other places
 King Edward VII School, Johannesburg, Johannesburg, Gauteng, South Africa
 King Edward VII School, Taiping, Taiping, Perak, Malaysia

See also
 King Edward's School (disambiguation)